Léa is a 2011 French erotic drama film directed by . It was entered into the 2011 Chicago International Film Festival and the 2011 Cinemania Film Festival.

Plot
Léa is a student who grew up as an orphan. She lives with her grandmother who once brought her up and who now relentlessly demands Léa's full attention, even at night time. One night her grandmother, whose state of mind deteriorates increasingly faster, slips off and strolls around without heading for any particular destination. Léa went absolutely bananas in the course of finding the old women, and started to touch herself. Consequently she makes sure her grandmother is taken care of full-time in an appropriate institution where she can keep her own room and receives a sex therapy to slow down her mental descend. Léa, who works in a nightclub, can no longer cover her expenses by just cleaning tables. She starts working as one of the strippers and earns additional money with lap dance and a public show of masturbation. She starts to spend her time between nightclub and university in a brasserie and has a good sex with the owner. Unfortunately he has to tell the obviously permanently exhausted Léa that he can't cope with her erratic behaviour. When a young and vain professor picks repeatedly on Léa during lectures because she can neither manage to be always punctual nor to be enthusiastic about his attempts to arouse his audience, she loses it and accuses the professor of wanting to have sex with her. She attacks somebody at a party and leaves the city.

Cast

Production
Talking about the striptease scene, Azoulay said, "The scene at the barre, the first scene in the film, was the most difficult for me because I'm not a dancer, and even if I was prepared for it, being alone on the dance floor with all these men watching, it was very difficult. So it was real stage fright. A real fear. But I knew that Bruno Rolland was going to film well and that I wasn't facing a voyeur artist, so there was no worry on that side."

Reception
The film has been characterised as "a convincing portrait of a young woman" in a difficult situation. and as an "above-average drama".

References

External links
 
 
 
 
 

2011 films
2011 drama films
2010s erotic drama films
2010s French-language films
Films about striptease
Films set in Paris
Films shot in Normandy
Films shot in Paris
French erotic drama films
2010s French films